The following highways are numbered 59:

International
 European route E59

Australia
 Bells Line of Road

Canada
 Alberta Highway 59
 Manitoba Highway 59

China 
  G59 Expressway

India
National Highway 59 (India)

Iran 
Road 59

Italy
 Autostrada A59

Japan
 Hakodate-Esashi Expressway

Korea, South
 National Route 59

New Zealand
 New Zealand State Highway 59

Philippines
 N59 highway (Philippines)

United Kingdom
 British A59

United States
 Interstate 59
 U.S. Route 59
 Alabama State Route 59
 Arkansas Highway 59
 California State Route 59
 Colorado State Highway 59
 Connecticut Route 59
 Florida State Road 59
 County Road 59 (Jefferson County, Florida)
 County Road 59 (Leon County, Florida)
 County Road 59 (Wakulla County, Florida)
 Georgia State Route 59
 Illinois Route 59
 Indiana State Road 59
 Kentucky Route 59
 Louisiana Highway 59
 Maryland Route 59 (former)
 M-59 (Michigan highway)
 Missouri Route 59
 Montana Highway 59
 Nebraska Highway 59
 Nebraska Link 59B
 Nevada State Route 59 (former)
 New Jersey Route 59
 County Route 59 (Bergen County, New Jersey)
 County Route 59 (Ocean County, New Jersey)
 New Mexico State Road 59
 New York State Route 59
 County Route 59 (Chautauqua County, New York)
 County Route 59 (Dutchess County, New York)
 County Route 59 (Herkimer County, New York)
 County Route 59 (Jefferson County, New York)
 County Route 59 (Madison County, New York)
 County Route 59 (Orange County, New York)
 County Route 59 (Oswego County, New York)
 County Route 59 (Putnam County, New York)
 County Route 59 (Rensselaer County, New York)
 County Route 59 (Schoharie County, New York)
 County Route 59 (St. Lawrence County, New York)
 County Route 59 (Steuben County, New York)
 County Route 59 (Suffolk County, New York)
 County Route 59 (Sullivan County, New York)
 County Route 59 (Washington County, New York)
 County Route 59 (Wyoming County, New York)
 North Carolina Highway 59 (former)
 North Dakota Highway 59
 Ohio State Route 59
 Oklahoma State Highway 59
 Oklahoma State Highway 59B
 Pennsylvania Route 59
 South Carolina Highway 59
 South Dakota Highway 59 (former)
 Tennessee State Route 59
 Texas State Highway 59
 Texas State Highway Spur 59
 Farm to Market Road 59
 Texas Park Road 59
 Utah State Route 59
 Virginia State Route 59
 West Virginia Route 59
 Wisconsin Highway 59
 Wyoming Highway 59

See also
List of highways numbered 59A
A59 (disambiguation)